Rudbaraki (also Romanized as Rūdbārakī and Rūdbār Key) is a village in Luleman Rural District, Kuchesfahan District, Rasht County, Gilan Province, Iran. At the 2006 census, its population was 1,095, in 335 families.

References 

Populated places in Rasht County